Chryseobacterium contaminans  is a Gram-negative and rod-shaped bacteria from the genus of Chryseobacterium which has been isolated from a rhizosphere contamination from an agar plate in Alabama in the United States.

References

Further reading

External links
 Type strain of Chryseobacterium contaminans at BacDive -  the Bacterial Diversity Metadatabase

contaminans
Bacteria described in 2014